Euphorbia rosea is a species of plant in the family Euphorbiaceae. It is native to Afghanistan, India, Iran, the Laccadive Islands, Nepal, Pakistan, Sri Lanka, and Vietnam.

References 

rosea
Flora of Afghanistan
Flora of India
Flora of Iran
Flora of the Laccadive Islands
Flora of Nepal
Flora of Pakistan
Flora of Sri Lanka
Flora of Vietnam